Republican Popular Unity (UPR) was a Spanish electoral candidacy formed to contest the 1986 general election by the Communist Party of Spain (Marxist–Leninist) (PCE (m–l)) and Republican Convention of the Peoples of Spain (CRPE).

References

Defunct political party alliances in Spain
Communist parties in Spain